National Democratic Party of Spain (in Spanish: Partido Demócrata Nacional de España) is a small far-right nationalist political party in Spain. In the 2004 parliamentary elections PDNE was the second least voted party, with just 232 votes.

References

Far-right political parties in Spain